Angelika Hoerle (née Margaretha Angelika Fick; 20 November 1899 – 9 September 1923) was a German Dada artist who was a founding member of the Cologne art group Stupid and the cofounder of a Dadaist publishing house.

Life
She was born Margaretha Angelika Fick on 20 November 1899 in Cologne, Germany. She was the daughter of cabinetmaker Richard August Michael Fick and Anna Maria (Kraft) Fick. She had three siblings, one of whom was fellow Dada artist Willy Fick.

Largely self-taught as an artist because the German art schools of the day did not admit women, in 1915 she became an apprentice milliner.

In 1919, she married the painter Heinrich Hoerle.

In 1922 she contracted tuberculosis. She died the following year on 9 September 1923, aged 23-years-old. She was buried in Cologne's West Cemetery.

Art career
In 1919, she and Heinrich moved to an apartment in Cologne-Lindenthal that they named  "dadaheim" (Dada home). Here they founded the Schloemilch Verlag publishing house, which published the international dadaist magazine  Die Schammade and Max Ernst's portfolio of lithographs entitled Fiat modes pereat ars. It was also a popular meeting place for the Cologne Dadaists.

In the same year, Hoerle and her husband were among the founding members of the art group Stupid.

Hoerle worked in a variety of styles ranging from caricature to Dada-inflected surrealism, mainly in the media of drawings, prints, and collages. Her surreal portraits quickly drew attention, but her career was cut short by her early death from tuberculosis. Much of her work was destroyed by the Nazis as 'Degenerate art', but her brother Willy hid 35 pieces, which were rediscovered in 1967.

Portraits of her were painted by Heinrich as well as by such artists as Jankel Adler, Anton Räderscheidt, and Marta Hegemann.

Recent exhibitions
 2008 Junker Simonskall, Hürtgenwald: Experiment Kalltalgemeinschaft 1919-1921 - The Cologne Progressives in Simonskall
 2009 Gallery of Ontario, Toronto: Angelika Hoerle: Cologne Comet of  Dada
 2009 Museum Ludwig Cologne: Angelika Hoerle: Comet of the Avantgarde

In popular culture
Hoerle's great-niece Angelika Littlefield wrote a play about her, Angelika's Promise, produced at the Art Gallery of Ontario in 2009.
Music: "Comets and Shadows" by Italo-Canadian composer Ennio A. Paola, https://www.youtube.com/watch?v=KB9lGd8pfZo

In 2016, the German writer Ute Bales wrote a novelization of Hoerle's life, Die Welt zerschlagen: Die Geschichte der Dada-Künstlerin Angelika Hoerle (The World Shattered: The Story of Dada Artist Angelika Hoerle).
Music: "The World Is Smashed | The World Is Shattered" by Italo-Canadian composer Ennio A. Paola"
https://soundcloud.com/ennio-a-paola/world-is-smashed...
"Comets & Shadows "- Sound Signature for projects on the brief life & times of Dada of Cologne artist Angelika Hoerle , which was given to readings by the author in the Künstlerhaus Schloss Balmoral (Bad Ems), in the Cabaret Voltaire (Zurich), in Simonskall. In February 2019 the piece premiered in a version for string quartet aboard "Oceania, Marina", Bora, Bora, South Seas, Pacific Ocean with Quadrivium Quartet (Poland)

References

Further reading
 de Zegher, Catherine, and Angelika Littlefield, Angelika Hoerle: The Comet of Cologne Dada, Art Gallery of Ontario, König, Köln, 2009, 

1899 births
1923 deaths
20th-century German painters
20th-century German women artists
Dada
Artists from Cologne
German dadaists